Eurasian Avar language may refer to:

 Avar language (Caucasian)

See also 
 Avar language (disambiguation)